Synta Technology Corporation of Taiwan (Synta Taiwan), also known as Synta, is a manufacturer of telescopes and optical components headquartered in Taoyuan, Taiwan.

Overview
Synta Technology Corporation was founded in Taoyuan, Taiwan around 1980 by mechanical and optical designer Dazhong Shen, (a/k/a David Shen). In 1992 Synta, along with Canadian
investors, established the Suzhou Synta Optical Technology Co., Ltd in Suzhou (Jiangsu), China (outside Shanghai) as a manufacturing facility producing telescopes for Celestron and Tasco. In 1999 Synta established the brand Sky-Watcher, with head offices in Richmond, British Columbia, to distribute products in Canada and Europe, and in the late 2000s, to the USA market. In 2005 Synta purchased the struggling US based Celestron, continuing its manufacture of Celestron products and running the US facilities through SW Technology Corporation, Synta's Delaware-based holding company. Synta also distributes under the Acuter name and manufactures products for Orion Telescopes & Binoculars.

References

Telescope manufacturers
Optics manufacturing companies
Manufacturing companies of Taiwan